Sthree Oru Dukham is a 1978 Indian Malayalam film,  directed by A. G. Baby. The film stars Kaviyoor Ponnamma, K. P. Ummer, Kuthiravattam Pappu and Muralimohan in the lead roles. The film has musical score by Joshi.

Cast
Kaviyoor Ponnamma
K. P. Ummer
Kuthiravattam Pappu
Muralimohan
T. P. Madhavan
Vidhubala
Bhavani

Soundtrack
The music was composed by Joshi and the lyrics were written by K. Narayanapilla.

References

External links
 

1978 films
1970s Malayalam-language films